Havana High School, or HHS, is a public four-year high school located at 501 South McKinley Street in Havana, Illinois, a small town in Mason County, in the Midwestern United States. HHS is part of Havana Community Unit School District 126, which serves the communities of Bath, Havana, Kilbourne, and Topeka. The campus lies 45 miles southwest of Peoria, 45 miles northwest of Springfield, and serves a mixed small city, village, and rural residential community.

Academics
In 2009 Havana High School did not make Adequate Yearly Progress, with 39% of students meeting standards, on the Prairie State Achievement Examination, a state test that is part of the No Child Left Behind Act. The school's average high school graduation rate between 1999-2009 was 82%.

Athletics and Activities
Havana High School competes in the Prairieland Conference and is a member school of the Illinois High School Association. The HHS mascot is the Ducks, with school colors of maroon and white. The school has one state championships on record in team athletics and activities, Boys Golf in 1998–1999.

The school offers competitive athletics opportunities in the following sports:
Boys Baseball
Boys and Girls Basketball
Boys and Girls Cross Country
Boys Football
Boys Golf
Girls Softball
Boys and Girls Track & Field
Girls Volleyball
Boys Wrestling (coop with Mason City High School)

The school offers the activities in the following areas:
Band
Chorus
Future Farmers of America (FFA)
Scholastic Bowl
Spirit
Student Council
Yearbook
Spanish Club
Science Club
Science Olympiad
FCCLA

History

Sources of material include:.

References

External links
 Havana High School
 Havana Community Unit School District 126

Public high schools in Illinois
Schools in Mason County, Illinois